The 1987 ECAC Metro men's basketball tournament (now known as the Northeast Conference men's basketball tournament) was held March 3–5. The quarterfinal and semifinal rounds were played on campus sites with the championship game held at McCann Field House in Poughkeepsie, New York. 

Marist defeated  in the championship game, 64–55 in overtime, to win the school's second ECAC Metro men's basketball tournament title. The Red Foxes earned the automatic bid to the 1987 NCAA Tournament.

Bracket

References

Northeast Conference men's basketball tournament
Tournament
ECAC Metro men's basketball tournament
ECAC Metro men's basketball tournament